Bishop's Court Halt (Manx: Staad Chooyrt Yn Aspick) was a station on the Manx Northern Railway, later owned and operated by the Isle of Man Railway; it served the  residence of the local bishop in the Isle of Man and was a stopping place on a line that ran between St. John's and Ramsey.

Description and history

The halt was built to serve the nearby estate of Bishop's Court, the home of the Bishop of Sodor and Man for the use of the bishop, his staff and visitors.  The halt was marked only by a bench and some steps leading down from the estate.

Dates
The opening date of the halt is not recorded although it probably dates from the opening of the line. The halt never appeared in the public timetable and saw only limited use which is well documented in The Isle of Man Railway by James I.C. Boyd (Oakwood Press, 1962).

Usage
A hand-operated signal was installed at the site which was operated by the bishop and his guests and staff in order to halt trains for them to board; the guard needed to be informed if someone wanted to alight. After 1935 it was only occasionally used as a private halt until closed in 1950.

Route

See also

 Isle of Man Railway stations
 Manx Northern Railway

Sources
 Isle of Man Steam Railway Supporters' Association

References
Bishop's Court Halt at the Subterranea Britannica Disused Stations website
Tom Heavyside. Narrow Gauge Branch Lines – Douglas to Ramsey 

Railway stations in the Isle of Man
Railway stations opened in 1879
Railway stations closed in 1950